Australian Indigenous art movements and cooperatives have been central to the emergence of Indigenous Australian art. Whereas many western artists pursue formal training and work as individuals, most contemporary Indigenous art is created in community groups and art centres.

The following external sites are links to some of the Aboriginal-owned and -operated art cooperatives. These cooperatives reflect the diversity of art across Indigenous Australia from the north west region where oscachre is significantly used; to the tropical north where the use of cross-hatching prevails; to the Papunya style of art from the central desert cooperatives. Art is increasingly becoming a significant source of income and livelihood for some of these communities.

Peak groups
These are organisations that represent, or include, a number of Indigenous art cooperatives.
Aboriginal Art Organisation 
ANKAAA: Association of Northern, Kimberley and Arnhem Aboriginal Artists - peak advocacy and support agency
Desart: Association of Central Australian Aboriginal Art and Centres

Indigenous art movements and cooperatives
There is a wide range of art centres. They are all Indigenous-owned and/or controlled and are all not-for-profit organisations or, in a few cases, companies owned by the artists (Papunya Tula; Jirrawun Arts). The oldest is Ernabella Arts, formed in 1948. The largest by sales in 2006 were Papunya Tula and Warlayirti.

References

Australian Aboriginal art
Cooperatives in Australia